Eriksrud is a surname. Notable people with the surname include:

Emil Eriksrud (1926–1990), Norwegian businessperson and judge
Rolv Eriksrud (born 1978), Norwegian ski mountaineer and cross-country skier
Simen Eriksrud (born 1975), Norwegian DJ, songwriter and record producer
Simone Eriksrud (born 1970), Norwegian musician, singer and composer